In quantum information theory, the no low-energy trivial state (NLTS) conjecture is a precursor to a quantum PCP theorem (qPCP) and posits the existence of families of Hamiltonians with all low-energy states of non-trivial complexity. An NLTS proof would be a consequence of one aspect of qPCP problems the inability to certify an approximation of local Hamiltonians via NP completeness. In other words, an NLTS proof would be one consequence of the QMA complexity of qPCP problems. On a high level, if proved, NLTS would be one property of the non-Newtonian complexity of quantum computation. NLTS and qPCP conjectures posit the near-infinite complexity involved in predicting the outcome of quantum systems with many interacting states. These calculations of complexity would have implications for quantum computing such as the stability of entangled states at higher temperatures, and the occurrence of entanglement in natural systems. There is currently a proof of NLTS conjecture published in preprint.

NLTS property 
The NLTS property is the underlying set of constraints that forms the basis for the NLTS conjecture.

Definitions

Local hamiltonians 

A k-local Hamiltonian (quantum mechanics)  is a Hermitian matrix acting on n qubits which can be represented as the sum of  Hamiltonian terms acting upon at most  qubits each:
 

The family of local Hamiltonians thus arises out of the k-local problem. Kliesch states the following as a definition for local Hamiltonians in the context of NLTS:
Let I ⊂ N be an index set. A family of local Hamiltonians is a set of Hamiltonians {H(n)}, n ∈ I, where each H(n) is defined on n finite-dimensional subsystems (in the following taken to be qubits), that are of the form
 
where each Hm(n) acts non-trivially on O(1) qubits. Another constraint is the operator norm of Hm(n) is bounded by a constant independent of n and each qubit is only involved in a constant number of terms Hm(n).

Topological order 

In physics, topological order is a kind of order in the zero-temperature phase of matter (also known as quantum matter). In the context of NLTS, Kliesch states: "a family of local gapped Hamiltonians is called topologically ordered if any ground states cannot be prepared from a product state by a constant-depth circuit".

NLTS property 
Kliesch defines the NLTS property thus:
Let I be an infinite set of system sizes. A family of local Hamiltonians {H(n)}, n ∈ I has the NLTS property if there exists ε > 0 and a function f : N → N such that
 for all n ∈ I, H(n) has ground energy 0,
 ⟨0n|U†H(n)U|0n⟩ > εn for any depth-d circuit U consisting of two qubit gates and for any n ∈ I with n ≥ f(d).

NLTS conjecture 
There exists a family of local Hamiltonians with the NLTS property.

Quantum PCP conjecture 

Proving the NLTS conjecture is an obstacle for resolving the qPCP conjecture, an even harder theorem to prove. The qPCP conjecture is a quantum analogue of the classical PCP theorem. The classical PCP theorem states that satisfiability problems like 3SAT are NP-hard when estimating the maximal number of clauses that can be simultaneously satisfied in a hamiltonian system. In layman's terms, classical PCP describes the near-infinite complexity involved in predicting the outcome of a system with many resolving states, such as a water bath full of hundreds of magnets. qPCP increases the complexity by trying to solve PCP for quantum states. Though it hasn't been proven yet, a positive proof of qPCP would imply that quantum entanglement in Gibbs states could remain stable at higher-energy states above absolute zero.

NLETS proof 
NLTS on its own is difficult to prove, though a simpler no low-error trivial states (NLETS) theorem has been proven, and that proof is a precursor for NLTS.

NLETS is defined as:
 Let k > 1 be some integer, and {Hn}n ∈ N be a family of k-local Hamiltonians. {Hn}n ∈ N is NLETS if there exists a constant ε > 0 such that any ε-impostor family F = {ρn}n ∈ N of {Hn}n ∈ N is non-trivial.

References 

Quantum information theory
Conjectures